Charan Sanit Wong Road is a main road in Bangkok's Thonburi side (west bank of Chao Phraya River), it is named in honour of Luang Charan Sanit Wong (ML Charan Sanitwong), the former Permanent Secretary, Ministry of Transport. Its name has been misspelled as จรัลสนิทวงศ์ in Thai according to the 1999 Royal Institute Dictionary.

Charan Sanit Wong Road runs through the three districts of Bangkok, namely Bangkok Yai, Bangkok Noi and Bang Phlat. It begins at Phet Kasem Road (Thailand Route 4), at the corners of the Tha Phra Intersection, Tha Phra MRT Station. It heads northwest through the Wat Tha Phra, Tha Phra Police Station, The Kingdom of Lesotho Consulate, Wat Chao Mun, Siam Technological College,  Sesawech Vidhaya School, and entrance to Wat Di Duad (Soi Charan Sanit Wong 12), cuts across Phanitchayakan Thon Buri Road (Soi Charan Sanit Wong 13) at Phanitchayakan Thon Buri Junction, and crossing the Khlong Mon and passes the Wat Pho Riang with Wat Bang Sao Thong, as well as the Metropolitan Electricity Authority (MEA) Thon Buri.

The road intersects Fai Chai Intersection, where it cuts Phran Nok and Phutthamonthon Sai 4–Phran Nok Roads, then bend to the northeast through Bang Khun Si Market, Makro Charan Sanit Wong Branch, and Charansanitwong Railway Halt in the area of Bang Khun Non and passes the Bang Khun Non Junction including the ancient temple Wat Suwannaram, before crossing Khlong Bangkok Noi near Wat Si Sudaram or formerly known as Wat Chi Pa Kao.

It runs through Borommaratchachonnani Intersection, where it meets Borommaratchachonnani and Somdet Phra Pinklao Roads on the boundary between Arun Amarin of Bangkok Noi and Bang Bamru with Bang Yi Khan of Bang Phlat near two prominent department stores PATA and Central Plaza Pinklao beneath Borommaratchachonnani Elevated Highway. From here, it fully enters Bang Phlat, passes Phong Sap Market and Wat Ruak Bang Bamru with runs continuously as far as Bang Phlat Intersection, where it meets Sirindhorn and Ratchawithi Roads near Wat Sing and Krung Thon Bridge.  Specifically, this phase it can be considered parallel to Samsen Road in Phra Nakhon side (east bank of Chao Phraya River).

Then head northeast across Khlong Bang Phlat into the area of Bang O passes Yanhee Hospital and Wimuttayarampittayakorn School, before ending at the foot of Rama VII Bridge in Bang Kruai, Bang Kruai District, Nonthaburi Province.

Currently, all the distance of Charan Sanit Wong is under construction of the extension MRT Blue Line (Bang Sue–Tha Phra), which is expected to open for service in the year 2020.

In the area of Bang Phlat that the road runs through, there are also two communities that conserve traditional Thai ways of life and play, were the creation of the Khon mask (Soi Charan Sanit Wong 71) and the angklung band of the local elderly (Soi Charan Sanit Wong 89, also known as Saeng Thong Community).  And Soi Charan Sanit Wong 86 is the location of Masjid Bang O, a historic masjid is remarkable with the architecture that combines Renaissance, Baroque, and Indian.

References

Streets in Bangkok
Bangkok Yai district
Bangkok Noi district
Bang Phlat district